The list of ship decommissionings in 1971 includes a chronological list of all ships decommissioned in 1971.


See also 

1971
 Ship decommissionings
Ship